Higher and Higher: The Best of Heaven 17 is a compilation album by English new wave and synth-pop band Heaven 17, released in 1993.

Content
The compilation includes singles from Heaven 17's first four studio albums Penthouse and Pavement (1981), The Luxury Gap (1983), How Men Are (1984) and Pleasure One (1986), plus two new remixes that were released as singles: "Temptation" (Brothers in Rhythm Remix), which reached number four in the UK Singles Chart in 1992 and "(We Don't Need This) Fascist Groove Thang" (Rapino Edit), which reached number 40 in 1993. The US version of the album includes the Tommy D Master Remix of "Penthouse and Pavement" in place of the original version. The remix was also released as a single in the UK in 1993, reaching number 54.

Re-issue
In 1999, Higher and Higher was re-issued as Temptation – The Best of Heaven 17, featuring new artwork and the same track listing as the original 1993 version.

Critical reception

In a review for AllMusic, Stephen Thomas Erlewine wrote that the album is "an adequate overview of [Heaven 17's] career", although he also described it as containing "too much music for casual fans", that the order of the tracks was "slightly illogical" and that the album is "not comprehensive enough for dedicated collectors".

Track listing
All tracks written by Glenn Gregory, Ian Craig Marsh and Martyn Ware.

Note
The US version of the album replaces track 14 with "Penthouse and Pavement" (Tommy D's Master Remix)

Production
Produced by B.E.F. except tracks 1, 4, 8, 10, 11, 15, 17 by B.E.F. & Greg Walsh; track 5 by Martyn Ware & Greg Walsh; tracks 9 and 12 by Heaven 17
Additional production and remix on track 1 by Brothers in Rhythm; track 2 by The Rapino Brothers; track 14 on U.S. version by Tommy D

Charts

References

External links
Higher and Higher: The Best of Heaven 17 at Discogs

1993 compilation albums
Heaven 17 albums
Virgin Records compilation albums